Opinion polling for the 2021 Czech legislative election started immediately after the 2017 legislative election. Monthly party ratings are conducted by Sanep, TNS Kantar, STEM and CVVM.

Graphical summary

Percentage
Poll results are listed in the tables below in reverse chronological order, showing the most recent first. The highest percentage figure in each polling survey is displayed in bold, and the background shaded in the leading party's colour. In case of a tie, then no figure is shaded. Poll results use the date the survey's fieldwork was done, as opposed to the date of publication; however, if this date is unknown, the date of publication is given in its place. There is an electoral threshold of 5% for political parties.

2021

2020

2019

2018 and 2017

Seats

2021

2017–2020

Other surveys

Notes

References

External links 
 Czech Republic — National parliament voting intention poll of polls by Politico.
 https://mandaty.cz/ shows trends and estimates hypothetical numbers of mandates 

2021
2021 Czech legislative election